Abrud is a town in the north-western part of Alba County, Transylvania, Romania, located on the river Abrud. It administers three villages: Abrud-Sat (Abrudfalva), Gura Cornei (Szarvaspataktorka) and Soharu (Szuhár).

Population

According to the census from 2011 there was a total population of 4,944 people living in this commune. Of this population, 96.66% are ethnic Romanians, 0.86% are ethnic Hungarians and 0.53% ethnic Romani.

Name
Although first recorded only in 1271 in the form terra Obruth, the name of the town might have derived from a supposed (not attested) Dacian word for gold, *obrud. The town's modern name reflects a characteristic vowel shift (from o to a) of the medieval Hungarian language.

History

Antiquity

The Romans erected a small fortification here in the 2nd century AD. It was part of the defence system of the gold mines nearby, in "Alburnus Maior" (nowadays, Roșia Montană), but it was abandoned in the 3rd century.

Middle Ages
Abrud was first recorded in 1271 in as terra Obruth. It gained town status in 1427.

18th-century revolts
In 1727, the leaders of a revolt gained control of the town. Another serfs' revolt began in the area in 1784 with Horea, Cloșca and Crișan as leaders fighting the Austrian Imperial forces. Abrud was captured by the uprising's members on 6 November, before the revolt was crushed by the Austrian army.

1848 revolution
During the Hungarian Revolution of 1848, negotiations took place in Abrud between the leaders of the Romanian peasants, led by Avram Iancu and Ion Dragoș, the envoy of Lajos Kossuth, deputy of Bihar County in the Parliament of Budapest, regarding the conciliation of the Romanian and Hungarian revolutionary forces. On May 6, in violation of the negotiated armistice, Major Imre Hatvani conducted a one-way action without any compliance by attacking and occupying Abrud which triggered the Abrud massacre. Hatvani embarked also on unnecessary killings, hanged Romanian lawyer Ioan Buteanu, while his drunken soldiers massacred prefect Petru Dobra. In the next two weeks 88 Romanians were killed in the central square, and around 2,500 Hungarians were killed in revenge by Iancu's army in Abrud and in Roșia Montană; Dragoș was also killed, being considered a traitor. The escalated conflict could not be settled, Abrud was conquered and lost several times by the Hungarian troops, until May 18 when they retreated to Arad.

Natives

 Ovidiu Bic
 Alexandru Ciura
 Ion Hebedeanu
 Antal Kagerbauer
 Alexandru Sterca-Șuluțiu
 Ioan Sterca-Șuluțiu
 Nick Stuart

Climate
Abrud has a humid continental climate (Cfb in the Köppen climate classification).

<div style="width:70%;">

References 

Populated places in Alba County
Localities in Transylvania
Towns in Romania
Mining communities in Romania